Méier is a railway station in Méier, Rio de Janeiro which is serviced by the Supervia.

History
Méier Station was opened in 1889, being part of the first section of the Central do Brasil Railroad, between Rio de Janeiro and Nova Iguaçu. During the turn of the century, the station had streetcars running to Inhaúma, though these have since been abandoned in favour of buses. With the growth of the city of Rio de Janeiro - In large part caused by the existence of the train line - passenger trains started to run with ever increasing frequency, and the line would be electrified in 1937. Méier Station would also get new entrances during these electrification works, which meant that passengers no longer had to walk on the tracks to access the station. The station was rebuilt in 2006 by the Rio de Janeiro State government working in partnership with the International Bank for Reconstruction and Development, getting new ramps to increase accessibility.

Notable places nearby
 João Nogueira Cultural Centre
 Lower Méier

Platforms
Platform 1A: Towards Deodoro (Stopper)
Platform 1B: Towards Central do Brasil (Stopper)

External links 
 Supervia webpage

References

SuperVia stations